William Nigel Wenban-Smith CMG (born 1 September 1936) is a British former diplomat.

Early life

Wenban-Smith was the son of William Wenban-Smith, a colonial administrator who served in the former Nyasaland (now Malawi). He was educated at The King's School, Canterbury followed by King's College, Cambridge, where he completed a Bachelor of Arts degree. He spent his national service in the Royal Navy.

Career

After national service, Wenban-Smith became a Plebiscite Supervisory Officer in the Southern Cameroons (now Ambazonia) from 1960 to 1961. At the time, this region was deciding to join Nigeria or become part of Cameroon, and he had some difficulty in communicating the exact terms of federation with Cameroon to voters.

He was then an Assistant Principal with the Commonwealth Relations Office - which would eventually be merged with the Foreign Office. Following diplomatic postings in the Democratic Republic of the Congo, Uganda, Ireland, and Belgium, he became Commissioner for the British Indian Ocean Territory (1982-1985) and then Deputy High Commissioner in Ottawa (1986-1989). In 1990 he was appointed High Commissioner to Malawi, succeeding Denis Osborne.

In retirement he served as Chairman of the Friends of the Chagos Islands Association and later earned an MA from the University of Buckingham.

References

1936 births
Living people
Members of HM Diplomatic Service
Alumni of King's College, Cambridge
Alumni of the University of Buckingham
Companions of the Order of St Michael and St George
20th-century British diplomats
Civil servants in the Commonwealth Relations Office
High Commissioners of the United Kingdom to Malawi